Gordon Bonner (1907-1985) was a rugby union international who was part of the British and Irish Lions team that toured New Zealand and Australia in 1930. He never represented England, and later changed code to play Rugby league.

Early life
William Gordon MacGregor Bonner was born in 1907 in Wakefield, West Riding of Yorkshire. He was the son of Arthur Alexander Bonner, a cattle dealer and also magistrate for Wakefield. His father was also a prominent member of the Rugby League establishment, at one time being president of the Wakefield Trinity rugby league club, and also between 1936 and 1938 was chairman of the Rugby Football League Council.

William went on to be educated at Queen Elizabeth Grammar School, Wakefield.

Rugby career
Bonner went on to play for Bradford and for Yorkshire as fullback. He played in ten of the matches on the toured New Zealand and Australia in 1930 at fullback. but he did not play in any of the tests. He scored two conversions during these games. Despite playing for the British team, he was never selected for England.

Rugby league club career
Gordon Bonner made his début for Wakefield Trinity (Heritage № 378) during September 1932, as a full-back he played 79-matches, scoring 1-try, and 31-goals, for 65-points. He later played for Castleford (Heritage № 171).He appears to have scored no drop-goals (or field-goals as they are currently known in Australasia), but prior to the 1974–75 season all goals, whether; conversions, penalties, or drop-goals, scored 2-points, consequently prior to this date drop-goals were often not explicitly documented, therefore '0' drop-goals may indicate drop-goals not recorded, rather than no drop-goals scored. In addition, prior to the 1949–50 season, the archaic field-goal was also still a valid means of scoring points.

Personal life
William Bonner married Mary (née Wood) in August 1934.

References

1907 births
1985 deaths
Bradford RFC players
British & Irish Lions rugby union players from England
Castleford Tigers players
English rugby league players
English rugby union players
People educated at Queen Elizabeth Grammar School, Wakefield
Rugby league fullbacks
Rugby league players from Wakefield
Rugby union fullbacks
Rugby union players from Wakefield
Wakefield Trinity players